Langra is a village in West Champaran district in the Indian state of Bihar.

Demographics
As of 2011 India census, Langra had a population of 3112 in 649 households. Males constitute 52.57% of the population and females 47.42%. Langra has an average literacy rate of 49.9%, lower than the national average of 74%: male literacy is 61.7%, and female literacy is 38.2%. In Langra, 18.95% of the population is under 6 years of age.

References

Villages in West Champaran district